The Newcastle Eagles are a professional basketball team based in Newcastle upon Tyne, England.

Playing in the top-tier British Basketball League and holding the franchise for Tyne & Wear, they are the most successful team in the League's history.

The Eagles moved into their own purpose-built arena, the Eagles Community Arena, in January 2019 when they hosted the Plymouth Raiders. Their traditional arch rivals are the Glasgow Rocks, however in recent years a rivalry with the Leicester Riders has also developed.

The Northumbria Northstars cheerleading team provide the cheerleaders known as the Eaglettes.

Franchise history

Early years and move to Tyneside
The club's roots can be traced back to the founding of EPAB Washington in 1976. The club played in Sunderland at the Crowtree Leisure Centre under various monikers throughout the 1980s and early 1990s, managing a second place league finish in 1983, as well as two play-off victories at Wembley in 1981 & '83. In 1995, the owner Dave Elderkin moved the club to Newcastle, to be known as the Newcastle Comets. Soon afterwards the club was bought by Sir John Hall, then the chairman of Newcastle United, adding them to his Newcastle Sporting Group of the city's football, ice hockey and rugby teams. Hall's Sporting Club group was considered by most observers to be a relative failure and upon its dissolution, Ken Nottage and Paul Blake became the Eagles' new owners. The final name change, from the Comets to the Eagles, took place in 1996. Performances remained consistent with the club achieving regular top five league placings from 1998 onwards.

The "Clean sweep" of 2005–06
The 2005–06 season proved to be the most successful in their history so far when, under the guidance of player/coach Fabulous Flournoy, the club achieved a "clean sweep" of trophies, including the BBL Cup, BBL Trophy and Championship "double".

In addition, Flournoy picked up the BBL Coach of the Year and former Villanova Wildcat, Andrew Sullivan, was voted BBL Player of the Year. Flournoy, Sullivan and Andrew Bridge were also members of the bronze medal winning England team in the 2006 Commonwealth Games during March 2006.

Recent times
At the start of the 2007–08 season it was announced that Nike and Northern Rock were to sponsor the Eagles, bringing in more money to the club.  Also, the signing of Richard Midgley gave great hope that the eagles could challenge Guildford Heat to regain the BBL League title.  However, after a bust up with player/coach, Fab Flournoy he soon left to join the Everton Tigers.  This meant there was no point guard and this led to the signing of Bryan Defares who could not settle in England and he too left.  Finally, at the third attempt, Steve Leven (former NBA prospect) was signed despite his bad boy reputation.  After defeat in the BBL Cup, then later defeat in the BBL Trophy Final the Eagles were in danger of having a poor season.  Fortunately, after a miraculous overtime win against Guildford Heat, they won the BBL League Title.

At the start of the 2008–09 season they were strengthened by the signing of Trey Moore from Cheshire Jets.  After an indifferent start, they embarked on a 17 match winning run to become the first team for nearly two decades to retain the BBL title, finishing 8 points ahead of Everton Tigers. They also reached the semi-finals of the BBL Cup, losing narrowly to Everton Tigers on aggregate before gaining revenge by beating them home and away in the BBL Trophy semi-final. The Eagles beat Guildford Heat at The Spectrum in the Final. In the play-offs they narrowly avoided an upset after seeing off Cheshire Jets 88–83 before beating Plymouth Raiders to form a match against Everton Tigers once again. Despite 30 points from ex-Eagles Richard Midgley, the Eagles held on for a 97–94 win, therefore winning the treble to cap off their most successful season since the clean sweep.

In the 2009–10 season the Eagles again retained the BBL title, finishing 2 points ahead of Sheffield Sharks.  The league title actually came down to the last game of the season with Sheffield Sharks losing their last game of the season 97–95 to Worthing Thunder thanks to Evaldas Zabas' basket 4 seconds from the end.  This completed the double for the Eagles who had won the BBL Trophy by beating 111–95 in the Final at The Spectrum.  In the BBL Cup Eagles lost 64–61 in the quarter-finals to Cheshire Jets and in the play-offs Everton Tigers beat the Eagles 190–158 on aggregate in the two legged semi-final.

At the start of the 2010–2011 season it was announced that the Esh Group, along with partners Northumbria University and Northumbrian Water would be the new main sponsors of the Eagles. In the BBL Cup the Eagles were beaten 204–182 on aggregate by the Mersey Tigers in the semi-finals.  Eagles had won the first leg at home 97–90 but lost the second leg away 114–85.  It was the Mersey Tigers who would beat the Eagles in the semi-finals of the BBL Trophy also.  After a rare first leg draw (82–82) away from home, the Eagles went down 77–74 at home.

Modern era

The club repeated the feat of 2005–06 by winning all of the trophies on offer in a season for a second time 2011–12. The previous season was the first time since 2003–04 that they had failed to win a trophy. They lost 7 league games, 3 less than in 2005–06, although this time around they were only required to play 30 games, 10 less than in 2005–06. They clinched the clean sweep with a victory over Leicester in the play-off final on 12 May. A hat-trick of sweeps was completed in the 2014–15 season.

Eagles Community Arena
In January 2019, the Eagles moved into their own purpose-built arena on the Scotswood Road. Success did not follow them there at first, as they crashed out of the BBL Trophy, BBL Cup and BBL Playoffs without reaching any finals, and finished 3rd in the BBL for the second consecutive season.

On the night of their first preseason game ahead of the 2019-20 British Basketball League season, the club was rocked by the announcement that head coach Fabulous Flournoy would leave the club after 17 years. Flournoy would join the Toronto Raptors, the then-defending NBA champions, as an assistant coach, reuniting with his friend and mentor Nick Nurse, who gave him his first professional contract with the Birmingham Bullets in 1996. Assistant coach Ian MacLeod was announced as his interim replacement as head coach.

Home venues
 1976-1978 - Northumbria Centre, Washington
 1978-1991 - Crowtree Leisure Centre, Sunderland
 1991-1995 - Northumbria Centre, Washington
 1995-2010 - Metro Radio Arena, Newcastle upon Tyne
 2010-2018 - Sport Central, Newcastle upon Tyne
 2019-present - Vertu Motors Arena, Newcastle upon Tyne

Season-by-season records

Club records

Accurate as of 7 October 2014 (Includes BBL Championship games only)

 3 pts scored – Russ Saunders 716
 Assists – Fabulous Flournoy – 1,528
 Blocked shots – Fabulous Flournoy – 320
 Defensive rebounds – Fabulous Flournoy – 1,497
 Field Goals scored – Charles Smith – 1,621 
 Free Throws scored – Charles Smith – 761
 Games Played – Fabulous Flournoy – 393
 Offensive Rebounds – Darius Defoe – 894
 Personal Fouls – Fabulous Flournoy – 1,075
 Points – Charles Smith – 5,897
 Steals – Fabulous Flournoy – 605
 Total Rebounds – Fabulous Flournoy – 2,139
 Turnovers – Fabulous Flournoy – 910

Trophies

League

 BBL Regular Season Winners: 2005–06, 2007–08, 2008–09, 2009–10, 2011–12, 2013–14, 2014–15 7
 BBL Regular Season Runners Up:  1990–91, 2004–05, 2010–11, 2012–13, 2015–16, 2016–17 6
 WBBL Championship Runners Up: 2015–2016,

Playoffs

 BBL Championship Play Off Winners: 2004–05, 2005–06, 2006–07, 2008–09, 2011–12, 2014–15, 2020–21 7
 BBL Championship Play Off Runners Up: 1989–90, 1990–91, 2012–13, 2013–14, 2016–17 5
 WBBL Championship Play Off Winners: 2015–2016,

Trophy
 BBL Trophy Winners: 2004–05, 2005–06, 2008–09, 2009–10, 2011–12, 2014–15, 2019-20 7
 BBL Trophy Runners Up: 2000–01, 2006–07, 2007–08, 2015–16 4

Cup

 BBL Cup Winners: 2005–06, 2011–12, 2014–15, 2015–16, 2016–17, 2020–21 6
 BBL Cup Runners Up: 2007–08, 2012–13, 2013–14 3
 English National Cup Winners: 1990–91 1
 English National Cup Runners Up: 1989–90 1

Players

Current roster

Female roster

Notable former players
To appear in this section a player must have either:
– Set a club record or won an individual award as a professional player.
– Played at least one official international match for his senior national team at any time.

- Olu Babalola
- Stedroy Baker
- Flinder Boyd
- Tony Dorsey
- Perry Lawson
- Richard Midgley
- Peter Scantlebury
- Tom Sherlock
- Andrew Sullivan
- Andrew Thomson
- Stuart Thomson
- Steve Leven
- Eddie Matthew
 Nigel Lloyd
 Zarko Jukić
 Pétur Guðmundsson
 Andre Jones
 Shawn Myers
 Jeremy Hyatt
 Scott Martin
 Trey Moore
 Dwayne Morton
 Kadiri Richard
 Charles Smith
 Lynard Stewart
 TJ Walker
- Ian Whyte

Head coach
Stats correct up to and including 4 September 2022

Retired numbers
5 TJ Walker, Guard, 2000–2007
10 Charles Smith, Forward, 2000–2016

Hall of Fame
 TJ Walker 2000–2007
 Lynard Stewart 2007–2010

Staff
 Chief Executive Officer - Sam Blake
 Managing Director - Paul Blake
 Chief Operating Officer - Susan Hunter
 Head coach – Marc Steutel
 Assistant coach – Gary Stronach
 Team Manager – Eric Wilson
 Development manager - Ian MacLeod
 Communications Manager - Dan Black
 Public Announcer - Howard Leighton
 Junior Development Officer - Chris Applewhite
 Academy coach - Calvin George
 Academy coach - Chloe Gaynor
 Academy coach - Ellen Totten
 Academy coach - Jack Burgess
 Community Coach - Sam Dobson
 Community Coach - Alistair Langley
 Community Coach - Matty Langley
 Community Coach - Martin Walton
 Community Coach - Carl Thompson
 Community Coach - Jacob Jonas
 Community Coach - Kristian Morton
 Community Coach - Mark Sowerby
 Community Coach - Jack Bertram
 Community Coach - Gerda Morkunaite
 Community Coach - Marina Fernandez

References

External links
 Official Newcastle Eagles website
 Newcastle Eagles news from ChronicleLive

 
Basketball teams established in 1976
Sport in Newcastle upon Tyne
Basketball teams in England
Sport in the City of Sunderland
1976 establishments in England
British Basketball League teams